The red-throated alethe (Chamaetylas poliophrys) is a species of bird in the family Muscicapidae. It is native to the Albertine Rift montane forests. Its natural habitat is subtropical or tropical moist montane forests.

References

red-throated alethe
Birds of Central Africa
red-throated alethe
Taxonomy articles created by Polbot